Marciano della Chiana is a comune (municipality) in the Province of Arezzo in the Italian region Tuscany, located about  southeast of Florence and about  southwest of Arezzo.

Marciano della Chiana borders the following municipalities: Arezzo, Castiglion Fiorentino, Foiano della Chiana, Lucignano, Monte San Savino.

The town is of medieval origins, dating to the Lombard domination in Tuscany; later it was acquired by the commune of Arezzo and then by the Republic of Siena. In 1554 it was the seat of the Battle of Marciano (or Scannagallo).

References

Cities and towns in Tuscany